Ambiorix's revolt was an episode during the Gallic Wars between 54 and 53 BC in which the Eburones tribe, under its leader, Ambiorix, rebelled against the Roman Republic.

Discontent among the subjugated Gauls prompted a major uprising amongst the Belgae against Julius Caesar in the winter of 54–53 BC, when the Eburones of north-eastern Gaul rose in rebellion under their leader Ambiorix. Fifteen Roman cohorts were wiped out at Atuatuca Tungrorum (modern Tongeren in Belgium) and a garrison commanded by Quintus Tullius Cicero narrowly survived after being relieved by Caesar in the nick of time. The rest of 53 BC was occupied with a punitive campaign against the Eburones and their allies, who were said to have been all but exterminated by the Romans.

Prelude
In 57 BC Julius Caesar conquered Gaul and also Belgica (modernday Northern France, Belgium and a southern section of The Netherlands to the Rhine River; and the north-western portion of North Rhine-Westphalia, Germany) In the battle of the Sabis Caesar defeated the Nervii, Viromandui and Atrebates. After this he turned against the Atuatuci, captured their stronghold, and sold the tribe into slavery.

The Eburones, who until Caesar's destruction of the Atuatuci had been vassals of that Belgic tribe, were ruled by Ambiorix and Catuvolcus. In 54 BC there was a poor harvest, and Caesar, whose practice was to commandeer a part of the food supply from the local tribes, was forced to split his legions up among a larger number of tribes. To the Eburones he sent Quintus Titurius Sabinus and Lucius Aurunculeius Cotta with the command of a recently levied 14th Legion from north of the Po and a detachment of five cohorts, a total strength of 9,000 men.

The Revolt of the Romans

First Attack and deception 
According to Caesar, Ambiorix and his tribesmen were equal in number of combatants to Sabinus' and Cotta's men. They attacked and killed several Roman soldiers who were foraging for wood in the nearby vicinity. The survivors fled back to their camp, followed by Ambiorix and his men. When the Romans counterattacked, Ambiorix set up a parley with the Romans in which he admitted his debt to Caesar who had taken his side in certain disputes with other Gallic tribes but said that, despite the limited strength of the Eburones, he was compelled to take action by pressure from the other tribes who were determined to win their freedom from the yoke of Rome. He claimed that a huge force of Germans, greatly angered by Caesar’s successes against them and his defeat of Ariovistus, were about to cross the Rhine and offered to give the Romans safe passage to the fort of either of two nearby legions to better resist this Gallo-German force.

Debate 
The Roman representatives, Quintus Junius and Gaius Arpineius, took the news back to the beleaguered fort. A council of war, attended by the leading officers and centurions, was formed. During this council, two opposing opinions took form. Speaking first, Cotta argued that they should not move without an order from Caesar. He pointed out that experience had shown them that Germans could be resisted from behind their fortifications, that they had plenty of supplies, were within easy reach of assistance from nearby legions and that they should not take at face value neither the news nor the advice of an enemy.

Denying that he was motivated by fear, Quintus Titurius Sabinus said that he believed that Caesar was on his way to Italy, that the Germans were about to add to the number of the besieging Eburones and that it seemed that they were about to face the combined wrath of grudge-ridden Germans and Gauls—for surely the militarily weak Eburones would not dare to face a Roman legion otherwise. Moreover, he said it would be better to make for a nearby legion and face the trouble with their comrades than to risk famine through a prolonged siege. The officers told their commanders that whichever view prevailed was not as important as coming to a unanimous decision. Cotta was finally forced to give way and Sabinus prevailed.

Roman defeat 
The Romans spent the night in disarray, putting together their belongings and preparing to march out of the fort once morning came. The enemy heard the hubbub in the Fort and prepared an ambush. When dawn broke, the Romans, in marching order (long columns of soldiers with each unit following the other), more heavily burdened than usual left the Fort. When the greater part of the column had entered a ravine, the Gauls assaulted them from either side and sought to harry the rearguard and prevent the vanguard from leaving the ravine.

Caesar notes that Sabinus lost his mind, running from cohort to cohort and issuing ineffectual orders. Cotta, by contrast, kept his cool and did his duty as a commander, in action his duty as a soldier. Due to the length of the column, the commanders could not issue orders efficiently so they passed word along the line to the units to form into a square. The troops fought bravely though with fear and in clashes were successful. Thus, Ambiorix ordered his men to discharge their spears into the troops, to fall back if attacked by a group of Romans and chase back the Romans when they tried to fall into rank. During the engagement, Cotta was hit full in the face by a sling-shot.

Then Sabinus sent word to Ambiorix to treat for surrender, a proposal which was acceded to. Cotta refused to come to terms and remained steadfast in his refusal to surrender, while Sabinus followed through with his plan to surrender. However, Ambiorix, after promising Sabinus his life and the safety of his troops, distracted him with a long speech, all the while slowly surrounding him and his men and slaughtering them. The Gauls then charged down en masse onto the waiting Romans where they killed Cotta, still fighting, and the great majority of the troops. The remainder fell back to the fort where, despairing of help, they killed each other. Only a few men slipped away to inform Titus Labienus of the disaster. Overall, one legion and 5 cohorts, around 7500 Romans, were killed in the battle. Gallic casualties are unknown.

Aftermath

After defeating Cotta and Sabinus, Ambiorix tried to raise a general revolt in Belgica. A Belgic attack on Quintus Tullius Cicero (younger brother of the orator Cicero), then stationed with a legion in the territory of the Nervii, led to a siege of the Roman camp during which Ambiorix unsuccessfully tried to repeat his earlier bluff. The attack ultimately failed due to the timely appearance of Caesar.

Titus Labienus, the commander of the Fourth legion, which was stationed in the southern Ardennes, discovered that Indutiomarus and the Treveri were rebelling as well. The Treverian leader called for aid from the Senones and Germanic tribes east of the Rhine. The Fourth legion withstood the siege and Indutiomarus was killed after an unsuccessful attack. His relatives made their escape across the Rhine.

Before targeting the Eburones themselves, Caesar first attacked Ambiorix's allies, forcing them to promise that they would not help the tribe who had destroyed Cotta and Sabinus. The Nervii were the first victims of the Roman retaliation. During that winter a force of four legions laid waste the fields, took a great many cattle and prisoners. The Menapii were then attacked by five legions to deprive Ambiorix of potential help. Five legions were sent because, according to Caesar, they, alone of all the tribes of Gaul, had never sent ambassadors to him to discuss terms of peace, and had ties of hospitality with Ambiorix. A renewed campaign of devastation finally forced them to submit, and Caesar placed his ally Commius of the Atrebates in control of them.

After this Caesar built a bridge across the Rhine and campaigned in Germania to punish the German tribes who had aided the Treveri.

When the Roman Senate heard what happened, Caesar swore to put down all the Belgic tribes. The Roman campaigns against the Belgae took a few years, but eventually the Belgae were no match against 50,000 trained Roman soldiers. The tribes were slaughtered or driven out and their fields burned. The Eburones ceased to exist following the campaign.

The fate of the leaders of the revolt is different but neither was taken to walk in Caesar's triumphal parade. Cativolcus was now old, weak and unable to endure the hardships of flight. He solemnly cursed Ambiorix for instigating the conspiracy, and then committed suicide by poisoning himself with yew. Ambiorix and his men, however, managed to cross the Rhine and disappeared without a trace.

References 
 Cassius Dio xl. 7-11;
Gaius Julius Caesar, The Gallic War, Loeb Edition, 2004.
Delbrück, Hans. History of the Art of War Vol I. 
 Adrien Hock, Etudes sur quelques campagnes de Jules César dans la Gaule-Belgique. Vue d'après nature, carte et plans.  Namur, publisher: Ad. Wesmael-Charlier, 1897. Pages 75–97.  available on line

External links
 Commentarii de Bello Gallico (in Latin, English, German & Italian)
 The Last Battle and Death of Lucius Arunculeius Cotta (chapters 24-37) - Latin
 The Last Battle and Death of Lucius Arunculeius Cotta (chapters 24-37) - English

Gallic Wars
54 BC
53 BC
Ambushes in Europe